Semantic unification is the process of unifying lexically different concept representations that are judged to have the same semantic content (i.e., meaning). In business processes, the conceptual semantic unification is defined as "the mapping of two expressions onto an expression in an exchange format which is equivalent to the given expression". 

Semantic unification has since been applied to the fields of business processes and workflow management. In the early 1990s Charles Petri at Stanford University introduced the term "semantic unification" for business models, later references could be found in and later formalized in Dr. Bendeck's dissertation.  Petri introduced the term 'pragmatic semantic unification" to refer to the approaches in which the results are tested against a running application using the semantic mappings. In this pragmatic approach, the accuracy of the mapping is not as important as its usability.

In general, semantic unification as used in business processes is employed to find a common unified concept that matches two lexicalized expressions into the same interpretation.

See also 
 Ontology alignment
 Schema Matching
 Semantic mapper
 Semantic integration
 List of language regulators
 Semantic parsing
 Open Mind Common Sense
 Doublespeak
 Disambiguation

References

Michael M. Richter, Knowledge Management - Process Modeling, Lecture Notes, Calgary University 2004.

Business process modelling
Semantics